Buried Alive is a live album and the third album from Swedish progressive rock group Änglagård. It was recorded 1994 in Los Angeles at Progfest. This was their last performance before the break-up.

Track listing
All songs were written by Änglagård.
"Prolog" – 2:20
"Jordrök" – 11:46
"Höstsejd" – 14:03
"Ifrån klarhet till klarhet" – 9:03
"Vandringar i vilsenhet" – 13:07
"Sista somrar" – 9:21
"Kung Bore" – 12:34

Personnel
 Thomas Johnson – Mellotron, Hammond B-3, grand piano and other keyboards
 Tord Lindman – Acoustic and electric guitar, mellotron, vocals and percussion
 Anna Holmgren – Flute and mellotron
 Johan Högberg – Bass and bass pedals
 Jonas Engdegård – Electric and acoustic guitar
 Mattias Olsson – Percussion

1996 live albums
Änglagård albums